William Morrill Cooke (born February 26, 1951) is a former American football defensive end in the National Football League (NFL) who played for the Green Bay Packers, the San Francisco 49ers, the Detroit Lions and the Seattle Seahawks.   Listed at 6'-5" and  249 lbs, he played professionally for 6 seasons and retired in 1980.

Early years
Bill was born February 26, 1951, in Lowell, Massachusetts, and grew up in neighboring Chelmsford where he attended Chelmsford High School and then Worcester Academy in Worcester, MA.

College years
Cooke first played collegiate ball for the University of Connecticut, and then from 1973-1974 at University of Massachusetts Amherst Under head coach Dick MacPherson, before being drafted by the Green Bay Packers in the 10th round of the 1975 NFL Draft.

(1974) Senior year, he was named to First-team All-Yankee Conference, and played alongside teammates; Ed McAleney, Tim Berra & Steve Schubert.

References

1951 births
Living people
Sportspeople from Lowell, Massachusetts
Players of American football from Massachusetts
American football defensive ends
UConn Huskies football players
UMass Minutemen football players
Green Bay Packers players
San Francisco 49ers players
Detroit Lions players
Seattle Seahawks players
Chelmsford High School alumni